The southern zigzag salamander (Plethodon ventralis) is a species of salamander in the family Plethodontidae. It is endemic to the United States.

Habitat
Its natural habitats are temperate forests, freshwater springs, rocky areas, and caves.

Reproduction
Adult females lay their eggs in caves during the summer.

Conservation status
It is threatened by habitat loss.

References

Amphibians of the United States
Plethodon
Taxonomy articles created by Polbot
Amphibians described in 1997